Shubhashish Bhutiani (born 20 July 1991) is an Indian film director, actor, screenwriter and script writer. He made his directorial debut in Bollywood with the film Mukti Bhawan based on relationships and family. He won National Film Award – Special Mention (feature film)  for directing Mukti Bhawan at 64th National Film Awards.

Mumbai-based Bhutiani was just 21 when he wrote and directed Kush, his thesis film for his undergraduate course at the School of Visual Arts, New York. Set against the backdrop of the 1984 anti-Sikh riots, the 25-minute film showcased his sensitivity and craftsmanship. It also won him several laurels: an award at the 2013 Venice International Film Festival, the National Film Award for Best Promotional Film (2013) and over 25 international awards. Kush was shortlisted for the 2014 Academy Award for Best Live Action Short Film.

Biography
Shubhashish Bhutiani grew up in a small Himalayan town in India where he attended Woodstock School. After being heavily involved in theatre he transitioned from acting to writing/directing and went to learn filmmaking at the School of Visual Arts in New York. His thesis film, Kush, premiered at the 70th Venice International Film Festival where it won the Orizzonti Prize for Best Short Film. Kush was shortlisted at the 2014 Academy Awards and has won over 25 awards all over the globe.

Filmography

Awards and nominations
Kush
Academy Awards 2014 – Shortlisted for Live Action Short Film
Venice International Film Festival 2013- Orizzonti Award for Best Short Film
Venice International Film Festival 2013 – Best Innovative Budget Award
Hamptons International Film Festival 2013 – Special Jury Prize for Cast Performances
FilmLabFestival 2013 – Winner Best Short Film
South Asian International Film Festival 2013 – HBO sponsored Best Short Film Award
Cleveland International Film Festival – Honorable Mention in International Short Film Award
Garden State Film Festival 2014 – Best International Narrative Short
Vilnius International Film Festival – Audience Award
Palm Springs Shortfest – HP Brigning The Borders Award Presented by Cinema Without Borders, Runner Up
College Television Award 2014 – Best Director
College Television Award 2014 – Best Short Film
2014 CINE Golden Eagle Award – Independent Division, Fiction Short
National Award presented by the President of India
Sikh International Film Festival – Best Short Film
Indian International Film Festival of Los Angeles – Audience Award
London Indian Film Festival – Satyajit Ray Award for Best Short Film
Dusty Film and Animation Pre-Production Grant
Dusty Film and Animation Post-Production Grant
School of Visual Arts William Arkel Recipient 2013
Mukti Bhawan
The film’s World Premiere was held at the 73rd Venice Film Festival 2016. Followed by Busan International Film Festival, South Korea 2016, Dubai International Film Festival 2016, EFM Berlin Film Festival, Goteborg Film Festival 2017, Sweden and Festival International Des Cinemas d’Asie De Vesoul, France 2017. The film was awarded the GRAND PRIX "ENRICHO FULCHIGNONI" and UNESCO Gandhi Medal at the Venice International Film Festival and is also the recipient of the Asia Cinema Fund by BIFF 2016, South Korea.It was adjudged the Critics Choice Award, Vesoul International Film Festival, France. It received a 10-minute standing ovation at the world premiere at Venice Film Festival.

References

1991 births
Living people
Film directors from Kolkata
Hindi-language film directors